Jaroslav Kostelný (born 19 April 1985) is a Slovak football defender who currently plays for the Fortuna Liga club FO ŽP Šport Podbrezová.

External links
MFK Ružomberok profile

References

1985 births
Living people
Slovak footballers
Association football defenders
FK Železiarne Podbrezová players
MFK Ružomberok players
SFC Opava players
FC Nitra players
Slovak Super Liga players
Expatriate footballers in the Czech Republic
Sportspeople from Banská Bystrica